The 2022–23 season is the 119th season in the history of Hellas Verona F.C. and their fourth consecutive season in the top flight. The club are participating in Serie A and the Coppa Italia.

Players

First-team squad

Pre-season and friendlies

Competitions

Overall record

Serie A

League table

Results summary

Results by round

Matches 
The league fixtures were announced on 24 June 2022.

Coppa Italia

References

Hellas Verona F.C. seasons
Hellas Verona